Statistics of Qatar Stars League for the 1983–84 season.

Overview
It was contested by 7 teams, and Al-Rayyan Sports Club won the championship.

League standings

References
Qatar - List of final tables (RSSSF)

1983–84 in Asian association football leagues
1983–84 in Qatari football